Betula ermanii, or Erman's birch, is a species of birch tree belonging to the family Betulaceae. It is an extremely variable species and can be found in Northeast China, Korea, Japan, and Russian Far East (Kuril Islands, Sakhalin, Kamchatka). It is noted for its peeling bark, which can sometimes be removed in sheets, but usually shreds and hangs from the trunk and under branches. Yellow-brown male catkins appear with the leaves in spring.

Erman's birch is widely cultivated outside its natural range. The cultivar 'Grayswood Hill' has gained the Royal Horticultural Society's Award of Garden Merit.

Leading tree nurseries including Barcham Trees  stock the species. It is consequently a frequently encountered street tree in London and other British towns and cities.

References

Further reading
 Ohwi, J. Flora of Japan, 1984. 
 Woody Plants of Japan, Vol. 1, 2000. 

ermanii
Plants described in 1831
Trees of China
Trees of Japan
Trees of Korea
Trees of Siberia
Trees of subpolar oceanic climate